is a passenger railway station located in the city of Nagahama, Shiga, Japan, operated by the West Japan Railway Company (JR West).

Lines

Station layout
The station consists of two opposed unnumbered side platforms connected by a footbridge. The station is unattended.

Platform

Adjacent stations

History
The station opened on 14 October 1931 on the Japanese Government Railway (JGR) Hokuriku Main Line. The station was closed on 1 November 1940 and reopened as "Sakata Station" on 10 December 1954 under the Japan National Railways (JNR) after World War II.  The station came under the aegis of the West Japan Railway Company (JR West) on 1 April 1987 due to the privatization of JNR. 

Station numbering was introduced in March 2018 with Tamura being assigned station number JR-A10.

Passenger statistics
In fiscal 2019, the station was used by an average of 1270 passengers daily (boarding passengers only).

Surrounding area
Nagahama Institute of Bio-Science and Technology
Shiga Prefectural Nagahama Dome 
Nagahama Science Park
Shiga Prefectural Nagahama Agricultural High School
Shiga Bunkyo Junior College
Nagahama Municipal Hospital

See also
List of railway stations in Japan

References

External links

JR West official home page

Railway stations in Shiga Prefecture
Railway stations in Japan opened in 1931
Hokuriku Main Line
Nagahama, Shiga